FC Nantes won Division 1 season 1982/1983 of the French Association Football League with 58 points.

Participating teams

 Auxerre
 SEC Bastia
 Bordeaux
 Stade Brest
 Stade Lavallois
 RC Lens
 Lille
 Olympique Lyonnais
 FC Metz
 AS Monaco
 FC Mulhouse
 AS Nancy
 FC Nantes Atlantique
 Paris Saint-Germain FC
 FC Rouen
 AS Saint-Etienne
 FC Sochaux
 RC Strasbourg
 Toulouse FC
 FC Tours

League table

Promoted from Division 2, who will play in Division 1 season 1983/1984
 Stade Rennais:Champion of Division 2, winner of Division 2 group A
 Sporting Toulon Var:Runner-up, winner of Division 2 group B
 Nîmes Olympique:Third place, winner of barrages against FC Tours

Results

Relegation play-offs

|}

Season statistics

Top goalscorers

Most assists

References

 Division 1 season 1982-1983 at pari-et-gagne.com

Ligue 1 seasons
France
1